Gianteresio Vattimo (born 4 January 1936) is an Italian philosopher and politician.

Biography
Gianteresio Vattimo was born in Turin, Piedmont. He studied philosophy under the existentialist Luigi Pareyson at the University of Turin, and graduated with a laurea in 1959. In 1963 he moved to Heidelberg and studied with Karl Löwith, Habermas and Hans-Georg Gadamer with a scholarship of the Alexander von Humboldt Foundation. Then, Vattimo returned to Turin where he became assistant professor in 1964, and later full professor of Aesthetics in 1969. While remaining at Turin, becoming Professor of Theoretical Philosophy in 1982, he has been a visiting professor at a number of American Universities.

For his works, he received honorary degrees from the universities of La Plata, Palermo, Madrid, Havana, San Marcos of Lima.

Vattimo says he was exempted from military service.

After being active in the Radical Party, the short-lived Alleanza per Torino, and the Democrats of the Left, Vattimo joined the Party of Italian Communists. He was elected a member of the European Parliament first in 1999 and for a second mandate in 2009.

He is openly gay and a nihilist who has embraced Friedrich Nietzsche's idea of God's death.

In March 2012 he was a speaker at the national congress of the Grand Orient of Italy in Rimini.

Philosophy
Vattimo's philosophy can be characterized as postmodern with his emphasis on "pensiero debole" (weak thought). This requires that the foundational certainties of modernity with its emphasis on objective truth founded in a rational unitary subject be relinquished for a more multi-faceted conception closer to that of the arts. He draws on the philosophy of Martin Heidegger with his critique of foundations and the hermeneutic philosophy of his teacher Hans-Georg Gadamer. Perhaps his greatest influence though is the thought of Friedrich Nietzsche, whose "discovery of the 'lie', the discovery that alleged 'values' and metaphysical structures are just a play of forces" (1993:93), plays an important role in Vattimo's notion of "weak thought".

Vattimo rejects any notion of a transcendental structure of reason or reality that would be given once and for all. This does not imply the loss of truth, but a Heideggerean reinterpretation of truth as the opening of horizons. Such truth is deeper than propositions which are made possible by such openings. Philosophies then are always responses to contingent questions, they are 'ontologies of actuality,' a thesis that can be confirmed by the historico-cultural links of particular philosophies. For hermeneutics to be consistent with its own rejection of metaphysics, it must present itself, argues Vattimo "as the most persuasive philosophical interpretation of a situation or 'epoch'" (1997:10). To do this, Vattimo proposes a reading of hermeneutics as having a "nihilistic" vocation.

To Vattimo, hermeneutics has become boring and vague, lacking any clear significance for philosophical problems. His answer is to insist on the nihilistic consequences of hermeneutics. The claim that "there are no facts only interpretations and this too is an interpretation" amounts to saying that hermeneutics cannot be seen as the most accurate/true description of the permanent structures of reality of human existence. Hermeneutics is not a metaphysical theory in this sense and so can only be "proved" by being presented as the response to a history of being, a history of the fabling of the world, of the weakening of structures, that is as the occurrence of nihilism.

This nihilistic reading of history involves a certain attitude towards modernity, whereby modernity is dissolved from within through a twisting, distorting radicalisation of its premises. Vattimo uses Heidegger's term Verwindung to capture this post-modern recovery from modernity.

History as a process of weakening (secularisation and disenchantment are other terms Vattimo uses) "assumes the form of a decision for non-violence" (1992:95). An ethics of communication along the lines suggested by Jürgen Habermas suffers, according to Vattimo, from finding itself in a substantially ahistorical position, while oscillating between formalism and cultural relativism (1992:117). For Vattimo it is only when hermeneutics accepts its nihilistic destiny that "it can find in 'negativity,' in dissolution as the 'destiny of Being' ... the orientating principle that enables it to realize its own original inclination for ethics whilst neither restoring metaphysics nor surrendering to the futility of a relativistic philosophy of culture" (1992:119).

In 2004, after leaving the party of the Democrats of the Left, he endorsed Marxism, reassessing positively its projectual principles and wishing for a "return" to the thought of the Trier philosopher and to a communism, rid of distorted Soviet developments, which have to be dialectically overcome. Vattimo asserts the continuity of his new choices with the "weak thought," thus having changed "many of his ideas." He namely refers to a "weakened Marx," as ideological basis capable of showing the real nature of communism. The new Marxist approach, therefore, emerges as a practical development of the "weak thought" into the frame of a political perspective. His next political book, co-authored with Santiago Zabala, is Hermeneutic Communism: From Heidegger to Marx (2011).

The authors explain the book Hermeneutic Communism as follows: "Although the material published here has never been released before, there are two books that have determined the production of this text: Gianni's Ecce Comu: Come si diventa cio che si era (2007) and Santiago's The Remains of Being: Hermeneutic Ontology After Metaphysics (2009). In the former, Vattimo emphasized the political necessity of reevaluating communism; in the latter, Zabala insisted on the progressive nature of hermeneutics. Hermeneutic Communism can be considered a radical development of both."

Views and opinions

Palestine and Israel
Vattimo added his name to a petition released on February 28, 2009, calling on the European Union to remove Hamas from its list of terrorist organizations and grant it full recognition as a legitimate voice of the Palestinian people.

On July 22, 2014, in response to the IDF military operation in Gaza against Hamas attacks on Israel, Vattimo said he would personally like to "shoot those bastard Zionists" and thinks Europeans should raise money "to buy Hamas some more rockets." He expressed his willingness to go to Gaza and fight side by side with Hamas and asserted, when asked if he would shoot at Israelis, that: 'By nature I'm non-violent, but I'd shoot at those (of them) who bomb  hospitals, private clinics and children.' Vattimo added that for him these were 'pure Nazis', the state itself a Nazi state (uno stato nazista) perhaps somewhat worse even than Hitler because in Israel's case, they have the support of the great Western democracies.

Accusations of anti-Semitism
Vattimo has been accused of anti-Semitism due to his anti-Zionism. Renzo Gattegna, the president of the Union of Italian Jewish Communities, accused him of anti-Semitism, writing "words of hatred that don't add anything new and are accompanied by the squalid reproposal of anti-Semitic stereotypes". Rabbi Barbara Aiello, Italy's first female rabbi, also accused Vattimo of anti-Semitism. Reacting to his "Zionist bastards" statements and to others like it, the foreign ministers for Italy, France and Germany said that they condemn such language as well as violence that has occurred at pro-Palestinian demonstrations in Europe. Pronounced in a moment of indignation against the prolonged bombing of Gaza by the Israeli army, Vattimo apologized to an Israeli newspaper (Haaretz). "In a telephone interview [...], Gianni Vattimo said he “regrets” such words and “feels ashamed” by them",  claiming he was "provoked" by the hosts of the show on which he made his comments.

Selected works

 (1991) The End of Modernity: Nihilism and Hermeneutics in Post-modern Culture, translated by John R. Snyder, Polity Press, 1991. Translation of La fine della modernità, Garzanti, Milan, 1985
 (1992) The Transparent Society, translated by David Webb, Johns Hopkins University Press, 1994. Translation of La società trasparente, Garzanti, Milan, 1989
 (1993) The Adventure of Difference: Philosophy after Nietzsche and Heidegger, translated by Thomas Harrison and Cyprian P. Blamires, Johns Hopkins University Press, 1993. Translation of Le avventure della differenza, Garzanti, Milan, 1980
 (1997) Beyond Interpretation: The Meaning of Hermeneutics for Philosophy, translated by David Webb, Stanford University Press, 1997. Translation of Oltre l'interpretazione, Laterza, Rome-Bari, 1994
 (1998) Religion by Jacques Derrida, edited by Gianni Vattimo, translated by David Webb, Stanford University Press, 1998
 (1999) Belief by Gianni Vattimo, et al., Polity Press, 1999. Translation of Credere di credere, Garzanti, Milan, 1996
 (2002a) Nietzsche: Philosophy as Cultural Criticism, translated by Nicholas Martin Stanford University Press, 2002. Translation of Introduzione a Nietzsche, Laterza, Rome-Bari,1985
 (2002b) After Christianity, New York: Columbia University Press, 2002.
 (2004) Nihilism and Emancipation: Ethics, Politics and Law, edited by Santiago Zabala, Columbia University Press, 2004
 (2005) The Future of Religion, Richard Rorty and Gianni Vattimo, edited by Santiago Zabala, Columbia University Press, 2005
 (2006) After the Death of God, John D. Caputo and Gianni Vattimo, edited by Jeffrey W. Robbins, Columbia University Press.
 (2008) Dialogue with Nietzsche, Gianni Vattimo, Columbia University Press.
 (2008) Art's Claim to Truth, Gianni Vattimo, edited by Santiago Zabala, Columbia University Press.
 (2009) Christianity, Truth, and Weak Faith, Gianni Vattimo and René Girard, edited by P. Antonello, Columbia University Press.
 (2010) The Responsibility of the Philosopher, Gianni Vattimo, edited by Franca D'Agostini, Columbia University Press.
 (2011) Hermeneutic Communism, Gianni Vattimo and Santiago Zabala, Columbia University Press.
 (2012) Weak Thought, translated by Peter Carravetta, SUNY series in Contemporary Italian Philosophy, 2012. Translation of Il pensiero debole, Feltrinelli, Milano, 1983 
 (2014) Deconstructing Zionism: A Critique of Political Metaphysics, edited by Gianni Vattimo and Michael Marder, Bloomsbury.

See also
Anti-Zionism#View that the two are interlinked
Deconstruction
Post-Marxism
Postmodern Christianity
Nihilism

References

Further reading
 Marta Frascati-Lochhead. Kenosis and Feminist Theology. The Challenge of Gianni Vattimo (SUNY, 1998)
 Rossano Pecoraro, Niilismo e Pós (Modernidade). Introdução ao pensamento fraco de Gianni Vattimo, Rio de Janeiro-São Paulo, PUC-Loyola ED. 2005.
 Martin G. Weiss, Gianni Vattimo. Einführung. Mit einem Interview mit Gianni Vattimo, Passagen Verlag, 2. Auflage: Wien 2006. .
 Giovanni Giorgio, Il pensiero di Gianni Vattimo. L'emancipazione dalla metafisica tra dialettica ed ermeneutica, Franco Angeli, Milano, 2006
 Davide Monaco, Gianni Vattimo. Ontologia ermeneutica, cristianesimo e postmodernità, Ets, Pisa 2006
 Weakening Philosophy. Essays in Honour of Gianni Vattimo, Edited by Santiago Zabala (with contributions from U. Eco, C. Taylor, R. Rorty, J-L. Nancy, F. Savater and many others), Montreal: McGill-Queen's University Press, 2007.
 Enrico Redaelli, Il nodo dei nodi. L'esercizio del pensiero in Vattimo, Vitiello, Sini, Ets, Pisa 2008.
 Wolfgang Sützl, Emancipación o Violencia. Pacifismo estético en Gianni Vattimo. Barcelona: Icaria 2007. 
 Ashley Woodward, Review of Weakening Philosophy. Essays in Honour of Gianni Vattimo, Edited by Santiago Zabala", in "Colloquy" Issue 15 June 2008.
 Mario Kopić, Gianni Vattimo Čitanka (Gianni Vattimo Reader), Zagreb, Antibarbarus, 2008. 
 Between Nihilism and Politics. The Hermeneutics of Gianni Vattimo. Edited by Silvia Benso and Brian Schroeder. New York: Suny 2010. 
 Matthew Edward Harris, Essays on Gianni Vattimo: Religion, Ethics and the History of Ideas. Newcastle-Upon-Tyne: Cambridge Scholars Publishing, 2016.
 Tommaso Franci, Vattimo o del nichilismo, Roma, Armando, 2011.
 Ricardo Milla, Vattimo y la hermenéutica política, en Isegoria (Madrid), 2011, julio, No 44, pp. 339–343
 Lozano Pino, Jesús, "El amor es el límite. Reflexiones sobre el cristianismo hermenéutico de G. Vattimo y sus consecuencias teológico-políticas", Madrid, Dykinson, 2015.  ISBN electrónico: 978-84-9085-282-8
 Brais González Arribas, Reduciendo la violencia. La hermenéutica nihilista de Gianni Vattimo. Madrid, Dykinson, 2016.
 Emilio Carlo Corriero, "Nietzsche's Death of God and Italian Philosophy". Preface by Gianni Vattimo, Rowman & Littlefield, London - New York, 2016
 Lozano Pino, Jesús, "El último Vattimo: Lección inaugural curso 2019-2020 de los Centros Teológicos de Málaga, Diócesis de Málaga, D.L. 2019. Depósito Legal:MA 1158-2019, .

External links 

"Mellow Nihilism": A Review of Gianni Vattimo's Nihilism and Emancipation
Vattimo in a discussion on
Articles of Vattimo in swif.uniba.it
Interview with Gianni Vattimo: “Democracy is not possible with absolute truths about co-existence”, Barcelona Metropolis, 2011.
Interview with Gianni Vattimo: "Only Weak Communism Can Save Us", MRZine, 2013
Europe's Times and Unknown Waters, Cluj-Napoca, Marga, Andrei (April 2009). "The Chaotic Society (Gianni Vattimo, The Transparent Society"

1936 births
20th-century essayists
20th-century Italian male writers
20th-century Italian non-fiction writers
20th-century Italian philosophers
21st-century essayists
21st-century Italian male writers
21st-century Italian non-fiction writers
21st-century Italian philosophers
Continental philosophers
Critics of Christianity
Critics of religions
Critics of the Catholic Church
Death of God theologians
Democrats of the Left politicians
Epistemologists
Gay politicians
Italian gay writers
Heidegger scholars
Hermeneutists
Italian essayists
Italian ethicists
Italian male non-fiction writers
Italian philosophers
Italy of Values MEPs
LGBT MEPs for Italy
LGBT philosophers
Italian LGBT rights activists
Living people
Marxist theorists
Members of the European Academy of Sciences and Arts
MEPs for Italy 1999–2004
MEPs for Italy 2009–2014
Metaphysicians
Nietzsche scholars
Ontologists
Party of Italian Communists politicians
Politicians from Turin
Phenomenologists
Philosophers of art
Philosophers of culture
Philosophers of education
Philosophers of history
Philosophers of mind
Philosophers of nihilism
Philosophers of religion
Philosophers of social science
Philosophers of war
Philosophy academics
Philosophy writers
Political philosophers
Postmodern writers
Italian social commentators
Social philosophers
Theorists on Western civilization
University of Turin alumni
Academic staff of the University of Turin
Writers about activism and social change
Writers about communism
Writers about globalization
Writers about religion and science